The Texas Interconnection is an alternating current (AC) power grid – a wide area synchronous grid – that covers most of the state of Texas. The grid is managed by the Electric Reliability Council of Texas (ERCOT).

The Texas Interconnection is one of the three minor grids in the North American power transmission grid. The other two minor interconnections are the Quebec Interconnection and the Alaska Interconnection.  The two major interconnections are the Eastern Interconnection and the Western Interconnection. The Texas Interconnection is maintained as a separate grid for political, rather than technical reasons, but can also draw some power from other grids using DC ties. By not crossing state lines, the synchronous power grid is in most respects not subject to federal (Federal Energy Regulatory Commission) regulation.

All of the electric utilities in the Texas Interconnection are electrically tied together during normal system conditions and operate at a synchronous frequency of 60 Hz.

Electric Reliability Council of Texas

The Electric Reliability Council of Texas (ERCOT) manages the flow of electric power on the Texas Interconnection that supplies power to 26 million Texas customers – representing 90 percent of the state's electric load. ERCOT is the first independent system operator (ISO) in the United States and one of nine ISOs in North America. ERCOT works with the Texas Reliability Entity (TRE), one of eight regional entities within the North American Electric Reliability Corporation (NERC) that coordinate to improve reliability of the bulk power grid.
 
As the ISO for the region, ERCOT dispatches power on an electric grid that connects 46,500 miles of transmission lines and more than 550 generation units. ERCOT also performs financial settlements for the competitive wholesale bulk-power market and administers retail switching for 7 million premises in competitive choice areas.

ERCOT is a membership-based 501(c)(4) nonprofit corporation, governed by a board of directors and subject to oversight by the Public Utility Commission of Texas (PUC) and the Texas Legislature.

ERCOT's members include consumers, electric cooperatives, generators, power marketers, retail electric providers, investor-owned electric utilities (transmission and distribution providers), and municipally owned electric utilities.

Production

Operating extremes

Power demand is highest in summer, primarily due to air conditioning use in homes and businesses. On July 19, 2018, consumer demand hit 73,259 MW. A new peak of 74,820 MW was set between 4 p.m. and 5 p.m. Central Daylight Time (2200 GMT) on Monday, August 12, 2019, as high temperatures in Houston hit 100 degrees Fahrenheit (38° Celsius). ERCOT had more than 78,000 MW of generating capacity available to meet demand in the summer of 2019, providing an adequate though not generous margin. For 2020, the forecasted peak demand is 76,696 MW. A megawatt of electricity can power about 200 Texas homes during periods of peak demand.

In an early morning period of low electricity demand, wind energy served more than 56% of total demand at 3:10 am Central Standard Time on Saturday, January 19, 2019. Two days later, ERCOT set a new wind output record of nearly 19.7 GW at 7:19 pm Central Standard Time on Monday, January 21, 2019.

Wind power in Texas

Wind power in Texas consists of over 40 wind farms, which together have a total nameplate capacity of over 30,000 MW (as of 2020). Texas produces the most wind power of any U.S. state and only a few countries exceed its installed capacity. According to ERCOT (Energy Reliability Council of Texas), wind power accounted for at least 15.7% of the electricity generated in Texas during 2017, as wind was 17.4% of electricity generated in ERCOT, which manages 90% of Texas's power.

The wind resource in many parts of Texas is very large. Farmers may lease their land to wind developers, creating a new revenue stream for the farm. The wind power industry has also created over 24,000 jobs for local communities and for the state. Texas is seen as a profit-driven leader of renewable energy commercialization in the United States. The wind boom in Texas was assisted by expansion of the state's Renewable Portfolio Standard, use of designated Competitive Renewable Energy Zones, expedited transmission construction, and the necessary Public Utility Commission rule-making.

The Roscoe Wind Farm (781 MW), near the town of Roscoe, is the state's largest wind farm. Other large wind farms in Texas include: Horse Hollow Wind Energy Center, Sherbino Wind Farm, Capricorn Ridge Wind Farm, Sweetwater Wind Farm, Buffalo Gap Wind Farm, King Mountain Wind Farm, Desert Sky Wind Farm, Wildorado Wind Ranch, and the Brazos Wind Farm.

Solar power in Texas

Solar power in Texas, along with wind power, has the potential to allow Texas to remain an energy-exporting state over the long term. The western portion of the state especially has abundant open land areas, with some of the greatest solar and wind potential in the United States.  Development activities there are also encouraged by relatively simple permitting and significant available transmission capacity.

Ties
Interconnections can be tied to each other via high-voltage direct current power transmission lines (DC ties), or with variable-frequency transformers (VFTs), which permit a controlled flow of energy while also functionally isolating the independent AC frequencies of each side.  The Texas Interconnection is tied to the Eastern Interconnection with two DC ties, and has a DC tie and a VFT to non-NERC (North American Electric Reliability Corporation) systems in Mexico. There is one AC tie switch in Dayton, Texas that has been used only once in its history (after Hurricane Ike).

On October 13, 2009, the Tres Amigas SuperStation was announced to connect the Eastern, Western and Texas Interconnections via eight 5 GW superconductor links.

Outages
 February 2011, gas shortages and low temperatures led to 30 GW of capacity being unavailable and caused load shedding. There were prior severe cold weather events in 1983, 1989, 2003, 2006, 2008, and 2010.
 February 2021, record low temperatures during the February 13–17, 2021 North American winter storm caused large loss of coal, natural gas, wind and nuclear plants power production and a shortfall of over 10GW of customer demand, and generated rolling blackouts across the state affecting more than 4 million people. Although some wind turbines iced up, wind power produced more overall power than expected for this time of year.
 Millions of people were without power and water for numerous days, leading people to resort to boiling snow as their only water source. Officially, the state of Texas blamed the 2021 storm for the death of 151 people. But the true number is believed to be four to five times that number, as many deaths are often attributed to underlying medical conditions instead of being related to loss of power which could cause the failure of life sustaining at-home medical devices. For comparison, other states hit by the same winter storm but without the power failure experienced by Texas did not have an increase in the number of deaths like Texas did. This shows a significant correlation that the increase in deaths was due to the loss of power.

References

Electric grid interconnections in North America
Electric power transmission systems in the United States
Energy infrastructure in Texas
Wide area synchronous grids